Berlinia coriacea is a species of plant in the family Fabaceae. It was previously thought to occur only in Nigeria, but recent collections have been made in Gabon and Cameroon. It is threatened by habitat loss.

References

Davies 296, de Wilde and de Wilde-Duyfjes 1927
Detarioideae
Flora of Nigeria
Vulnerable plants
Taxonomy articles created by Polbot
Taxa named by Ronald William John Keay